Neelam Muneer Khan (Pashto/; born 20 March 1992) is a Pakistani actress and model who appears in television dramas and films. She is best known for portraying the role of Ulfat in television series Dil Mom Ka Diya (2018), which earned her a nomination at the 18th Lux Style Awards for Best TV Actress. She made her film debut with comedy-thriller film Chupan Chupai (2017), followed by a starring role in romantic-comedy Wrong No. 2 (2019), both of which were commercially successful.

Early life 
Neelam Muneer was born in Mardan, Khyber Pakhtunkhwa, Pakistan but was brought up in Karachi. Her father died when she was three years old. Her mother raised Neelam and her three sisters as a single parent. While in school, she stepped into modelling and later completed her graduation privately. She was initially approached by Shamoon Abbasi for a television series. Eventually, she entered the television industry with director Kazim Pasha's drama serial Thora Sa Aasmaan, which aired on PTV Home.

Career

Television 
Muneer made her acting debut with drama series Thoda Sa Aasmaan. Later, she appeared in Meri Subha Ka Sitara on Geo TV, Qaid-e-Tanhai, Aankh Macholi, Shehr-e-Dil Ke Darwazey, on Hum TV, Jal Pari, Ashk on Geo TV and Urdu 1's serial Meri Saheli Meri Humjoli. She also appeared in the Geo TV serials Meri Behen Maya and Daray Daray Naina. In 2018, she played the leading role in social drama Umm-e-Haniya. The same year, she portrayed the role of Ulfat in the highly acclaimed drama series Dil Mom Ka Diya, which became one of the most watched show in the history of Pakistani television. The series earned her a nomination at the 18th Lux Style Awards for Best TV Actress. From 2019 to 2020, she appeared in Kahin Deep Jaley opposite Imran Ashraf where she portrays an innocent girl, Rida, whose cousin's jealousy and hatred caused many misfortunes and hardships for her.

In 2020, she appeared in Bikhray Moti, a serial co-produced by Humayun Saeed and Samina Humayun Saeed alongside Yasir Nawaz and Wahaj Ali. In this serial Muneer played Ayeza, a strong and independent girl.

Film 
In 2017, Muneer made her film debut with the comedy thriller Chupan Chupai opposite Ahsan Khan. Rahul Aijaz of The Express Tribune thought that Muneer ''serves her limited function of sprinkling masala in the film.'' The film earned her a nomination for Best Film Actress at the 17th Lux Style Awards. She next starred in the romantic-comedy film Wrong No. 2 opposite Sami Khan, which was a sequel to 2015 film Wrong No. The film was released on Eid al-Fitr, 2019. Her performance in the film was better-received. Both Chupan Chupai and Wrong No. 2 proved to be commercial successes. Muneer performed an item number in film Kaaf Kangana. Haiya Bokhari of Dawn noted that, ''Muneer doesn't exactly bust out scandalous moves; she emotes with her eyes and facial expressions, trying to make sense of the dialogues of the song.''

In 2022, she played dual roles of twins in murder mystery film Chakkar.

Filmography

Films

Television

Telefilms

Special appearances

Accolades

References

External links 
 

Pakistani female models
Living people
Pakistani television actresses
21st-century Pakistani actresses
People from Swabi District
1992 births